Phanoptis vitrina is a moth of the family Notodontidae first described by Herbert Druce in 1886. It is found in Colombia, Panama and Costa Rica.

Adults have a semitransparent white forewing cross band. Furthermore, the wing ground color is generally chocolate brown.

References

Moths described in 1886
Notodontidae of South America